The Point Loma Formation is a sedimentary geological formation in Southern California. The strata date back to the Late Cretaceous epochs of the Cretaceous period, during the Mesozoic Era.

The formation is named after the Point Loma peninsula in southwestern San Diego County, California.

Description

The Point Loma Formation was first described as the middle formation of the Rosario Group by Kennedy and Moore in 1971.  Their description is that the lower half is composed of interbedded fine-grained, dusky yellow sandstone and olive-gray clay shale in ledgy graded beds about 20 cm thick, which grades into massive grayish-black siltstone in the top half of the formation.

Part of the Rosario Group, it overlies the Lusardi Formation, and underlies the Cabrillo Formation.  The formation is found from Point Loma north to La Jolla, within the city of San Diego.

Fossils
The formation contains foraminifers, mollusks, and coccoliths.  These were used to date the formation biostratigraphically.

Dinosaur remains have been recovered from this formation. In 1967 Brad Riney found a single hadrosaur neck vertebra in a sea cave in La Jolla. In 1983 he found a femur of a hadrosaur in Carlsbad and in 1986 thirteen cervical vertebrae of another hadrosaur. In 1987 Riney discovered teeth and fragments of the postcranium of the ankylosaur Aletopelta coombsi. In about 1980 Leon Case found the midsection of a right dentary with teeth of a hadrosaur while walking along a beach in San Diego County.

See also

 
 
 List of dinosaur-bearing rock formations

References

Further reading
 
 

Geologic formations of California
Upper Cretaceous Series of North America
Cretaceous California
Geology of San Diego County, California
Geography of San Diego
Point Loma, San Diego